Giles Waldo Hotchkiss (October 25, 1815 – July 5, 1878) was a U.S. Representative from New York during the American Civil War.

Biography
Born in Windsor, New York, Hotchkiss attended the common schools, Windsor Academy, and Oxford Academy.
He studied law.
He was admitted to the bar in 1837 and began practice in Binghamton, New York.
He served as delegate to the Republican National Convention in 1860.

Hotchkiss was elected as a Republican to the Thirty-eighth and Thirty-ninth Congresses (March 4, 1863 – March 3, 1867).
He was an unsuccessful candidate for renomination in 1866.

Hotchkiss was elected to the Forty-first Congress (March 4, 1869 – March 3, 1871).
He was not a candidate for renomination.
He resumed the practice of law in Binghamton, where he died July 5, 1878.
He was interred in Spring Forest Cemetery.

References
 Retrieved on 2009-05-12

External links

1815 births
1878 deaths
People of New York (state) in the American Civil War
Republican Party members of the United States House of Representatives from New York (state)
19th-century American politicians
People from Windsor, New York
People from Binghamton, New York